Happy Creek is an unincorporated community in Warren County, Virginia, United States.

References

Unincorporated communities in Warren County, Virginia
Unincorporated communities in Virginia